Cole Perfetti (born January 1, 2002) is a Canadian professional ice hockey centre for the  Winnipeg Jets of the National Hockey League (NHL). He was selected tenth overall by the Jets in the 2020 NHL Entry Draft.

Growing up in Whitby, Ontario, Perfetti spent his minor hockey career with various Toronto-based teams. As a teenager, he enrolled at The Hill Academy while also playing for the Vaughan Kings of the Greater Toronto Hockey League. In the year prior to his Ontario Hockey League (OHL) eligibility, Perfetti led them in scoring with a total of 52 goals and 73 assists for 125 points. As a result of his play, Perfetti was recruited to join the University of Michigan's men's ice hockey team but ultimately chose to join the Saginaw Spirit of the OHL.

During his OHL career, Perfetti set numerous franchise records due to his scoring prowess. As a rookie, he set a new franchise record for most goals scored by a rookie and earned consideration as a highly touted prospect. In his second season, Perfetti recorded 102 points through 56 games to set a new franchise record while also helping them clinch a spot in the 2020 OHL Playoffs. Due to the COVID-19 pandemic, his sophomore season was cut short and he joined the Jets' American Hockey League (AHL) affiliate, the Manitoba Moose, to start his professional career.

Early life
Perfetti was born on January 1, 2002, in Whitby, Ontario, to parents Angelo and Sandra. His father formerly served as a scout for the Arizona Coyotes of the National Hockey League.

Playing career

Amateur
Growing up in Whitby, Ontario, Perfetti spent his minor hockey career with various Toronto-based teams. At the age of 10, he won the Brick Invitational Super Novice Hockey Tournament in Edmonton along with his Toronto Bulldogs teammates. During the tournament, he tallied nine points in six games. Following this, Perfetti enrolled at The Hill Academy while also playing for the Vaughan Kings of the Greater Toronto Hockey League. In the year prior to his Ontario Hockey League (OHL) eligibility, Perfetti led them in scoring with a total of 52 goals and 73 assists for 125 points. 

As a result of his GTHL play, Perfetti was recruited to join the University of Michigan's men's ice hockey team for the 2018–19 season. However, after being drafted fifth overall by the Saginaw Spirit during the 2018 OHL Priority selection draft, he rescinded his commitment and joined the OHL. Perfetti began his rookie campaign by scoring the first goal of the 2018–19 season in his OHL debut on September 19, 2018. As the season progressed, Perfetti continued to produce offensively and quickly surpassed Jan Mursak to set a new franchise record for most goals scored by a rookie. At the time of his record-setting goal, Perfetti also led all league rookies in goals and points through 53 games. His scoring prowess helped lead the Spirit to their 40th win of the season for the first time since 2010–11. As such, he was named one of the OHL Rookies of the Month for February. He earned this honour again in March after leading all rookies with seven goals and four assists through eight games to help the Spirit secure its first West Division title since 2011. On March 9, he became the first 16-year-old rookie to record four goals in one game since Ryan Spooner did so in March 2009. Although Perfetti helped the Spirit qualify for the OHL playoffs, they were eliminated in Game Seven of the Western Conference Championship Series by the Guelph Storm. He finished the regular season with 37 goals for 74 points through 63 games but lost the 2019 Rookie of The Year Award to Quinton Byfield.

As a result of his rookie season with the Spirit, Perfetti was considered a highly touted prospect for the 2020 NHL Entry Draft by the NHL Central Scouting Bureau. He returned to the Spirit for the 2019–20 season where he greatly improved on his previous seasons total. By February 2020, Perfetti recorded 102 points through 56 games to set a new franchise record while also helping them clinch a spot in the 2020 OHL Playoffs. He finished the season first on the Spirit in scoring and second in the league overall with 37 goals and 74 assists through 61 games. As a result of his play, Perfetti was named to 2019-20 OHL Second All-Star Team and ranked fourth among North American skaters eligible for the 2020 NHL Draft. He was also named the Canadian Hockey League’s Scholastic Player of the Year after maintaining a 93 per cent academic average throughout the year.

After his selection by the Winnipeg Jets in the first round (10th overall) of the 2020 NHL Entry Draft, Perfetti was signed to a three-year, entry-level contract with the Jets on November 10, 2020.

Professional
Following the signing of his entry-level contract, Perfetti joined the Jets' American Hockey League (AHL) affiliate, the Manitoba Moose, for the 2020–21 season. Due to the ongoing restrictions in the COVID-19 pandemic, the start of the regular season was pushed back to February 5, 2021. Perfetti subsequently made his professional debut with the Moose on February 15, 2021, in a 3–2 loss to the Toronto Marlies. During the game, he also scored his first professional goal. Following his debut, Perfetti tallied two goals and two assists in his first 10 professional games. He continued to produce as the season continued and was eventually honored as the CCM/AHL Rookie of the Month for April after tallying 13 points through nine games during the month. His eight goals and 15 assists overall placed him sixth among rookie scorers with 23 points. Perfetti thus became the first forward and fourth player in franchise history to earn this honor. Perfetti finished the season with nine goals and 17 assists for 26 points to earn the teams' Rookie of the Year Award.

Perfetti made his NHL debut on October 13, 2021, against the Anaheim Ducks. In his debut, he recorded one hit through 9:49 minutes of ice time in the eventual 4–1 loss. He played in one more game for the Jets before being assigned to their AHL affiliate, the Manitoba Moose. He later scored his first NHL goal January 18, 2022, in a loss to the Washington Capitals.

International play

 

Perfetti played for Team Canada White at the 2018-19 U17 World Hockey Challenge.  He finished second in tournament scoring with 2 goals and 7 assists in five games.

Following his success at the U17 World Hockey Challenge, Perfetti was chosen to represent Team Canada at the 2019 Hlinka Gretzky Cup. During the tournament, he scored two goals and added another three goals through eight rounds of shootout to lead Team Canada to the gold medal round. He led the tournament with 12 points through five games to set a new tournament record as Canada clinched a silver medal. He was invited to participate in Team Canada's camp for the 2020 World Junior Ice Hockey Championships but was cut prior to the final roster decisions.

Perfetti eventually made Team Canada's junior team for the 2021 World Junior Ice Hockey Championships after scoring impressing the coaching staff through intrasquad games during the camp.

Perfetti made his senior international debut with Team Canada at the 2021 IIHF World Championship in Latvia. During the tournament, he helped Team Canada overcome a 3–0 record by scoring two goals en route to a gold medal.

Player profile

Described as a player with a high hockey IQ, Perfetti has drawn comparisons to Nikita Kucherov by hockey pundits prior to his draft. Craig Button of Sportsnet described Perfetti as "an elite scoring left winger in the mold of New York Rangers star Artemi Panarin." After being drafted by the Jets, general manager Kevin Cheveldayoff cited his playmaking, his creativeness, and his ability to manipulate defenders as reasons for drafting him, seeing it as ideal for the team.

Personal life
During the COVID-19 pandemic, Perfetti started a non-profit organization called "Fetts’ Friends" to provide meals to the Environmental Service and Supply Chain employees at Covenant HealthCare.

Career statistics

Regular season and playoffs

International

Awards and honours

References

External links
 

2002 births
Living people
Canadian ice hockey centres
Manitoba Moose players
National Hockey League first-round draft picks
People from Whitby, Ontario
Saginaw Spirit players
Winnipeg Jets draft picks
Winnipeg Jets players